is a mountain in the Kongō Range to the south of Mount Kongō, rising to an elevation of . The mountain is situated between Chihayaakasaka, Osaka and Gojō, Nara in Japan. It is known for its trails being generally easy for most hikers, and for its stands of Japanese cedar and large fields of bamboo grass.

Despite being just off the popular Diamond Trail, most hikers bypass the mountain as they go between Mount Kongō to the north and Mount Jinpuku to the southwest. The summit is accessible via multiple routes from all sides of the mountain, and most hikes take about 90 minutes.

Location
Despite being very close to Mount Kongō, and being on the Diamond Trail, there are fewer serious mountain climbers.

Environs
On the Osaka side, extensive reforestation efforts of Japanese cedar and bamboo grass (Sasa veitchii) have taken place, but they have produced mixed results. 

On the approach to the summit on the Gojō side, various shrubs and large fields of Sasa veitchii grow everywhere due to the lack of tall trees blocking out the sunlight. In the middle of all the sasa fields is a class 3 triangulation station (the name of the station is ).

Access and amenities
The trails on the mountain generally rise in elevation fairly slowly, so the mountain is popular with recreational hikers.

The peak is just off the Diamond Trail, a  hiking trail centered on Mount Kongō. Even though it has many hikers traversing by its peak, most bypass Mount Naka Katsuragi on the way to Mount Jinpuku and  after ascending to the base of Mount Kongō via the Mount Kongo Ropeway. 

Cell service is available at the summit.

Gallery

See also
Mount Izumi Katsuragi
Mount Minami Katsuragi
Mount Yamato Katsuragi

References

External links

Yamakei Online - Mount Naka Katsuragi 

Mountains of Osaka Prefecture
Mountains of Nara Prefecture